Al Mukaynis is a locality of Mebaireek located in the municipality of Ar Rayyan, Qatar. Mudhlem Cave, which translates to "Dark Cave" in Arabic, is located in the area. Nearby Al Rekayya Farms (Irkaya Farms) is a popular bird watching site.

In J.G. Lorimer's Gazetteer of the Persian Gulf, Al Mukaynis was mentioned as a stopover on the route from Hofuf to Doha as early as 1908.

Climate
The following is climate data for Mukenis obtained from Qatar Meteorology Department.

References

External links
 Geography.org

Populated places in Al Rayyan